The New Deal is a live album released by the Canadian electronic music trio The New Deal in 2001. The bulk of the album was recorded at performances in Atlanta GA, Ithaca NY, Northampton MA, and Montreal QC, though it was sculpted into a larger piece in the studio.

The album was nominated for Alternative Album of the Year at the 2003 Juno Awards.

Track listing
 Back to the Middle 	        – 4:18
 Receiver 	                – 6:25
 Exciting New Direction 	– 5:08
 Self Orbit 	                – 3:20
 Intro (Deep Sun)  	        -  :53
 Deep Sun 	                – 7:06
 Glide 	 	        – 5:08
 Talk Show  	                – 6:01
 Technobeam 	                – 9:12
 The Ray Parker Suite:, Pt. 1 	– 2:37
 The Ray Parker Suite:, Pt. 2 	– 2:06
 Then and Now 	                – 9:26

References

2001 albums
The New Deal (band) albums